William Fliss (July 22, 1928 – December 21, 2013) was a Canadian football player, who played for the Winnipeg Blue Bombers.

References

1928 births
2013 deaths
Players of Canadian football from Manitoba
Canadian football people from Winnipeg
Winnipeg Blue Bombers players